Hilda Elizabeth Guevara Gómez is a Peruvian politician and was Congresswoman representing Moquegua for the 2006–2011 term. Guevara belongs to the Peruvian Aprista Party.

External links

Official Congressional Site

Living people
Year of birth missing (living people)
American Popular Revolutionary Alliance politicians
Members of the Congress of the Republic of Peru
Women members of the Congress of the Republic of Peru